Palur Station (PL) is a class-III railway station located in Dagen, Jaten, Karanganyar Regency, Central Java, Indonesia. The station is located at an altitude of +93 meters and only serves KAI Commuter Yogyakarta Line. The station is about 100 meters to the northeast from Karanganyar main highway (Jalan Raya Karanganyar) and not far from the national highway linking nearby city of Surakarta and Surabaya in East Java.

The station was built by Staatsspoorwegen, originally with three tracks. The Staatsspoorwegen-built building was demolished to make way for the tracks, and replaced with a new building located southeast of the old one.

Palur Station was previously serving Prambanan Express commuter rail to  until December 2011. Between 2021-22, the railway electrification extended into the station, as the preparation for the planned extension of KAI Commuter Yogyakarta Line. On 17 August 2022 the station, alongside Solo Jebres, underwent a public trial of the Yogyakarta Line service, and officially opened shortly thereafter. The station become the easternmost station served by the line.

Services
KAI Commuter Yogyakarta Line, to

References 

Railway stations in Central Java